MV Paul R. Tregurtha is a Great Lakes-based bulk carrier freighter. She is the current Queen of the Lakes, an unofficial but widely recognized title given to the longest vessel active on the Great Lakes. Launched as MV William J. De Lancey, she was the last of the thirteen "thousand footers" to enter service on the Great Lakes, and was also the last Great Lakes vessel built at the American Ship Building Company yard in Lorain, Ohio. The MV Paul R. Tregurtha is the current flagship for the Interlake Steamship Company.

Construction 
The Interlake Steamship Company was given a contract in 1979 by its customer Republic Steel, to transport iron ore from Lake Superior ports to their steel mill at Indiana Harbor, or to their transshipment terminal at Lorain.

Designed by the American Ship Building Company to fulfill two briefs:
 Bulk carrier
 Executive passenger transportation

With the second brief in mind, she was one of the first freighters with full air conditioning, elevators, and luxurious décor. Built in two parts, her keel was laid down on July 12, 1979, at the American Ship Building Company yard in Toledo, Ohio. On completion, the forward section was towed to their yard in Lorain, Ohio where it was mated with the stern portion.

Stephens-Adamson designed a loop belt elevator system, that feeds a stern mounted  discharge boom that can be swung 100 degrees to port or starboard. Capable of unloading at a rate of 10,000 long tons of iron ore per hour, or 6,000 net tons of coal per hour, the total system displaces 14,497 tons.

Formally launched on February 4, 1981, the vessel was christened on April 25, 1981, as MV William J. De Lancey, named in honor of Republic Steel's chairman who participated in the launch. In 1990 she received her current name. Paul R. Tregurtha, born 1935, was the Vice Chairman of Interlake Steamship Company's Board.

Operations 
MV William J. De Lancey departed Lorain on her maiden voyage on May 10, 1981, sailing in ballast to Silver Bay, Minnesota, to load  of iron ore pellets. She arrived back in Lorain on May 16, 1981. She holds a number of cargo records:
 August 7, 1982:  load at Escanaba, Michigan, for Indiana Harbor
 July 20, 1983: broke the Lorain port record delivering  of iron ore pellets from Escanaba. She then established a lower lakes record by loading  net tons of coal from Ashtabula to Consumers Power, becoming the largest cargo loaded on the lower Great Lakes.
 Holds lower lakes record of 50,239 net tons of coal, shipped from Ashtabula, Ohio, to Consumers Power
 2001 season: Carried the most cargo through the Soo Locks at 

On termination of the Republic Steel contract, on May 23, 1990, she was rechristened MV Paul R. Tregurtha at Sturgeon Bay, Wisconsin, named in honor of the Vice Chairman of Interlake Steamship Co. On May 3, 2002, her only captain died in his cabin, Captain Mitch Hallin, aged 55.

In winter 2004, she was asked to transport a reserve of coal to Algoma Steel in Sault Ste. Marie, Ontario, necessitating a mid-winter voyage. Loading 43,000 net tons in Conneaut, Ohio, both United States and Canadian Coast Guard services provided ice breaking assistance so that the voyage was completed without any delays. After unloading on January 29, she departed for her normal winter lay-up in Sturgeon Bay, Wisconsin.

She was the subject of a television program in the first season of Discovery Channel Canada's series Mighty Ships. That program recounts how in 2008, while leaving Sturgeon Bay, Wisconsin, MV Paul R. Tregurtha got stuck in ice and cracked steel plating on the port side of her bow, causing ballast tank water to leak out. Framing beneath the plating was also bent and cracked. After undergoing repairs at the Fraser Shipyards in Superior, Wisconsin, she then loaded her coal cargo at the dock and carried it to Detroit, Michigan.

2012 and 2014 grounding incidents 
[[File:Paul R. Tregurth aground (7795870986).jpg|thumb|right|MV 'Paul R. Tregurtha aground in the outbound channel of the St. Marys River, August 15, 2012]]

At around 3 a.m. on August 15, 2012, as she was proceeding downbound with 62,000 tons of coal, the bow of MV Paul R. Tregurtha'' grounded in the outbound channel of St. Marys River, just north of the Neebish Island ferry crossing, near Sault Ste. Marie. Her stern then pivoted and grounded on the opposite side of the channel, completely blocking the approach to the Rock Cut in the Lower St. Marys River. With assistance from the U.S. Coast Guard, at 5:30 a.m. on August 19, two tugs with a combined  moved the stern of the ship into the middle of the channel. This enabled salvage experts to successfully raise the ship's bow by filling stern voids which reduced the amount of forward weight on the rocks, and hence refloat the vessel.

During the afternoon of September 20, 2014, she was involved in an incident in Duluth, Minnesota, when she ran aground just off the Bayfront Festival Park in the Duluth Harbor Basin, just west of the Aerial Lift Bridge.

References

External links 

 Official MV Paul R. Tregurtha Webpage
 MV Paul R. Tregurtha at the Interlake Steamship Company
 Paul R. Tregurtha at MarineTraffic.com
 WYR4481: Paul R. Tregurtha at Realtime Great Lakes Weather Data and Marine Observations, National Oceanic and Atmospheric Administration

1981 ships
Merchant ships of the United States
Ships built in Lorain, Ohio
Queen of the Lakes